Damage is a 1992 romantic psychological drama film directed and produced by Louis Malle and starring Jeremy Irons, Juliette Binoche, Miranda Richardson, Rupert Graves, and Ian Bannen. Adapted by David Hare from the novel Damage by Josephine Hart, the film is about a British politician (Irons) who has a sexual relationship with his son's soon-to-be fiancée and becomes increasingly obsessed with her. Richardson was nominated for an Academy Award for Best Supporting Actress and won a BAFTA Award for Best Actress in a Supporting Role for her performance as the aggrieved wife of the film's main character.

Plot
Dr. Stephen Fleming, a physician who has entered politics and become a minister, lives in London with wife Ingrid and daughter Sally. Their adult son, Martyn, a young journalist, lives elsewhere in London. At a reception, Stephen meets a young woman, Anna Barton, the daughter of a British diplomat and four-times married Frenchwoman. Anna introduces herself as a close friend of Martyn's; she and Stephen are instantly attracted to each other. Some time later, Martyn brings Anna to meet his parents at their elegant townhouse and reveals they are romantically involved. The sexual tension between Stephen and Anna is apparent, although Martyn and Ingrid seem unaware.

After Anna calls his office, Stephen goes to her flat, where they have sex. The following day, Martyn is promoted and Ingrid arranges a celebratory dinner. There, Ingrid seems suspicious and interrogates Anna about her childhood. Anna says her brother, a year older, committed suicide at age 16 over "love." After dinner, Martyn drives Anna home and Stephen follows them. Once Martyn leaves, Stephen enters and tells Anna how much he "wanted to touch her during dinner", leading to them having sex again. Anna describes her brother's death, after he had expressed incestuous desire, saying "he wanted me all to himself and not to grow up." She says that damaged people are dangerous, and that she hates possessiveness.

Stephen's obsession with Anna deepens; on a whim, he leaves a conference in Brussels to go to Paris, where Anna is spending the weekend with Martyn. While Martyn sleeps, Stephen and Anna have sex in a doorway. Afterwards, Stephen moves in opposite Anna and Martyn, spying on them; he now wants to be with Anna permanently, even if it destroys his family. Anna dissuades him, assuring him that, as long as she is with Martyn he will always have access to her. Visiting Anna's home, Stephen finds Peter Wetzler (Stormare), her former lover. A jealous Stephen assumes Anna is cheating and, when Peter leaves, confronts her. Anna denies it and recounts that, when she witnessed her brother's suicide, she had fled to Peter and slept with him as a reaction.

The Flemings visit Edward Lloyd, Ingrid's father and Stephen's political mentor, to celebrate her birthday. Martyn announces that Anna has accepted his proposal of marriage, which visibly disturbs Stephen. That night, Sally observes him leaving Anna's room. An anxious Stephen lies about it, telling Sally he was talking to Anna about the marriage because Ingrid was upset. Later, the Flemings have lunch with Anna's mother, Elizabeth, who disparages the marriage, saying that Martyn doesn't seem like Anna's 'usual type' but noting how closely he resembles Anna's dead brother. Elizabeth notices the strained behavior between Anna and Stephen. She deduces the affair and warns Stephen to end it.

Stephen initially complies and ends the relationship. He tries to confess to Martyn and Ingrid, separately, but in the end does not do it. He phones Anna, but hangs up when Martyn answers. Anna sends a key to Stephen's office, with the address of a flat where they can meet. She tells Stephen that she could not marry Martyn without being with him. They meet at the flat and begin another tryst, but Martyn—having discovered about the flat by chance—finds them in bed. Stunned, he accidentally falls over a railing to his death. A devastated Stephen clutches him while Anna silently leaves.

Stephen's affair is exposed and becomes a media frenzy. An anguished Ingrid questions whether he had ever loved her and tells him she wishes they had never met. Stephen resigns his government position. Meeting Anna's mother, he discovers Anna is staying with her, but he and Anna are silent in their last meeting. Stephen, leaving his wife and daughter, retires to a rented room in a southern European town. In narration, he reveals that he saw Anna only once more, in passing at an airport, and that she has a child with Peter. Stephen stares at a huge blowup on his wall of a photo Martyn gave him of Stephen, Anna and Martyn together. He ends with a calm note: "She was no different from anyone else."

Cast

 Jeremy Irons as Dr. Stephen Fleming
 Juliette Binoche as Anna Barton
 Miranda Richardson as Ingrid Thompson-Fleming
 Rupert Graves as Martyn Fleming
 Ian Bannen as Edward Lloyd
 Peter Stormare as Peter Wetzler
 Gemma Clarke as Sally Fleming
 Leslie Caron as Elizabeth Prideaux
 Julian Fellowes as Donald Lyndsay, MP
 Tony Doyle as the Prime Minister
 Ray Gravell as Dr Fleming's chauffeur.
 Susan Engel as Miss Snow
 David Thewlis as a detective
 Benjamin Whitrow as a civil servant

Reception

Critical reception
Gene Siskel considered it one of the year's best films upon its release, commenting that it is "written smart, written with a topicality, so the characters seem credible", and went on to say that "Damage is a real special film". Roger Ebert described it as "one of the most compelling films [he'd] ever seen", and rated the film 4 out of 4 stars.

In a positive review for the LA Times, Kenneth Turan had much praise for the film, particularly the performances of Irons, Binoche, and Richardson, commenting "working together with great seriousness of purpose and a considerable amount of skill, this team has turned Damage into high-class entertainment, carefully controlled, beautifully mounted and played with total conviction. Its lurid soul may have more in common with Jackie Collins than Jane Austen, but its passionate nature and convincing performances can’t help but draw you in."

Peter Travers of Rolling Stone magazine praised Louie Malle's direction of the film and a "faithful film version" in regards to the original novel by Josephine Hart. Of the cast, Travers was most favourable towards Richardson's performance: "Richardson is extraordinary; it’s a brave, award-caliber performance."

Todd McCarthy's review for Variety was somewhat more mixed, stating that "Damage is a cold, brittle film about raging, traumatic emotions. Unjustly famous before its release for its hardly extraordinary erotic content, this veddy British-feeling drama from vet French director Louis Malle proves both compelling and borderline risible, wrenching and yet emotionally pinched, and reps a solid entry for serious art house audiences worldwide. But more mainstream Yank viewers led by publicity to expect a hot or romantic time will be in for a dry two hours."

In a mixed review from Matt Mueller for Empire magazine, he was slightly critical of the film, rating it at 3 out of 5 stars, and  mentioned that "walking a precarious line between stark, penetrating drama and pretentious twaddle, Louis Malle's terribly British vision of erotic obsession, adapted from Josephine Hart's bestseller, is alternately compelling and risible, hypnotic and remote." However, he praised Richardson, particularly for her performance in a scene nearing the end of the film, stating that "Damage achieves a level of gut-wrenching emotional intensity that had previously been absent."

Box office
The film was released in the United States on 23 December 1992 and grossed $140,777 in four theatres in its first five days. It went on to gross $7,532,911 in the US and Canada. The film grossed £1,865,371 in the United Kingdom. Outside of the United States it grossed over $23 million, for a worldwide total of over $31 million.

Awards and nominations

2022 adaptation
In March 2022, it was announced that a second adaption of Damage was set to be developed for Netflix in the form of an original three-part limited series. It is produced by France's Gaumont Film Company and Moonage Pictures in the UK. It has been confirmed that the cast will include Richard Armitage as William (originally Stephen), Charlie Murphy as Anna, Indira Varma as Ingrid, and Rish Shah as Martyn, while Pippa Bennett-Warner will also feature in cast. The series will be written by Morgan Lloyd-Malcolm and Benji Walters, with Glenn Leyburn and Lisa Barros D'Sa directing. Matthew Read, Frith Triplady and Alison Jackson will serve as executive producers.

References

External links
 
 
  
 
 Damage at the TCM Movie Database

1992 films
1992 romantic drama films
British romantic drama films
BAFTA winners (films)
French erotic drama films
French romantic drama films
1990s English-language films
1990s French-language films
British erotic drama films
Films based on Irish novels
Films directed by Louis Malle
Films scored by Zbigniew Preisner
Incest in film
StudioCanal films
Adultery in films
Films about dysfunctional families
English-language French films
New Line Cinema films
1990s British films
1990s French films